Culicoides boyi is a species of midge found in Scandinavia. It can be differentiated from its cogenerated by wing and maxillary palp characteristics.

References

Further reading
Lassen, S. B., et al. "Molecular differentiation of Culicoides biting midges (Diptera: Ceratopogonidae) from the subgenus Culicoides Latreille in Denmark." Parasitology research 110.5 (2012): 1765-1771.

boyi
Nematoceran flies of Europe
Diptera of Scandinavia
Insects described in 2015